Francis John McDowell is the current Church of Ireland Archbishop of Armagh and Primate of All Ireland.

Education and ministry
He was born in 1956 and educated at Annadale Grammar School and Queen's University Belfast where he took a degree in history. He also holds a diploma in business studies from the London School of Economics and a BTh in theology and biblical studies from Trinity College Dublin. He pursued a career in business before being ordained in 1996.

Priestly ministry
He initially served as Curate of Antrim, in the Diocese of Connor (1996–1999), and subsequently Rector of Ballyrashane, in the same diocese (1999–2002), and Rector of St Mark's Church, Dundela, in the Diocese of Down and Dromore (2002–2011), during which time he was also an Honorary Secretary of the General Synod (2008–2011).

Episcopal ministry
He was appointed Bishop of Clogher by the House of Bishops on 30 May 2011; and consecrated on 23 September that year in St Macartin's Cathedral, Enniskillen.

He was elected Church of Ireland Archbishop of Armagh and Primate of All Ireland in 2020 and took up his role on 28 April of that year.

References

External links
 

1956 births
Living people
Alumni of Queen's University Belfast
21st-century Anglican bishops in Ireland
Bishops of Clogher (Church of Ireland)
Anglican archbishops of Armagh
Irish Anglican archbishops